The rivers in India play an important role in the lives of its people. They provide potable water, cheap transportation, electricity, and the livelihood for many people nationwide. This easily explains why nearly all the major cities of India are located by the banks of rivers. The rivers also have an important role in Hindu Religion and are considered holy by many Hindus in the country.

Seven major rivers along with their numerous tributaries make up the river system of India. The largest basin system pours its waters into the Bay of Bengal; however, some of the rivers whose courses take them through the western part of the country and towards the east of the state of Himachal Pradesh empty into the Arabian Sea. Parts of Ladakh, northern parts of the Aravalli range and the arid parts of the Thar Desert have inland drainage.

All major rivers of India originate from one of the following main watersheds:

Aravalli range
Himalaya and Karakoram ranges
Sahyadri or Western Ghats in western India
Vindhya and Satpura ranges and Chotanagpur plateau in central India

Himalayan glaciers in the Indian subcontinent are broadly divided into three river basins, namely the Indus, Ganges and Brahmaputra. The Indus basin has the largest number of glaciers (3500), whereas the Ganges and Brahmaputra basins contain about 1000 and 660 glaciers, respectively. The Ganges is the largest river system in India. However, these rivers are just three among many. Other examples are Narmada, Tapathi, and Godavari.

The Indo-Gangetic plains
The Indo gangetic plains are known as Ganga-Satluj Ka Maidaan (गँगा सतलुज का मैदान), this area is drained by 16 major rivers. The major Himalayan Rivers are the Indus, Ganges, and Brahmaputra. These rivers are long, and are joined by many large and important tributaries. Himalayan rivers have long courses from their source to sea (in India Arabian sea and Bay of Bengal).

Aravalli Range River System
Following rivers flow from the Aravalli range, both northwards to Yamuna as well as southwards to Arabian Sea.

 North-to-south flowing rivers, originate from the western slopes of Aravalli range in Rajasthan, pass through the southeastern portion of the Thar Desert, and end into Gujarat. 
 Luni River,  originates in the Pushkar valley near Ajmer, ends in the marshy lands of Rann of Kutch. 
 Sakhi river,  ends in the marshy lands of Rann of Kutch. 
 Sabarmati River,  originates on the western slopes of Aravalli range of the Udaipur District, end into the Gulf of Cambay of Arabian Sea.
 West to north-west flowing rivers, originate from the western slopes of Aravalli range in Rajasthan, flow through semi-arid historical Shekhawati region, drain into southern Haryana. Several Ochre Coloured Pottery culture sites, also identified as late Harappan phase of Indus Valley civilisation culture, has been found along the banks of these rivers.
 Sahibi River, originates near Manoharpur in Sikar district flows through Haryana, along with its following tributaries: 
 Dohan river, tributary of Sahibi river, originates near Neem Ka Thana in Alwar district). 
 Sota River, tributary of Sahibi river, merges with Sahibi river at Behror in Alwar district.
 Krishnavati river, former tributary of Sahibi river, originates near Dariba zinc and lead mines in Rajsamand district of Rajasthan, flows through Patan in Dausa district and Mothooka in Alwar district, then disappears in Mahendragarh district in Haryana much before reaching Sahibi river.
 West to north-east flowing rivers, originating from the eastern slopes of Aravalli range in Rajasthan, flow northwards to Yamuna.
 Chambal River, a southern-side tributary of Yamuna river. 
 Banas River,  a northern-side tributary of Chambal river.
 Berach River,  a southern-side tributary of Banas River, originates in the hills of Udaipur District.
 Ahar River,  a right-side (or eastern side) tributary of the Berach river, originates in the hills of Udaipur District, flows through Udaipur city forming the famous Lake Pichola.
 Wagli Wagon River, a right-side tributary of the Berach River.
 Gambhiri River, a right-side tributary of the Berach river. 
 Orai River, a right-side tributary of the Berach River.

Ganges River System
The major rivers in this system are (in order of merging, from west to east)
Ganges -  Starting from Gangotri Glacier, Uttarakhand, India
Chambal -  Flows through Madhya Pradesh, Rajasthan and merges into Yamuna in Uttar Pradesh
Betwa -  Not Himalayan river, covers Madhya Pradesh and Uttar Pradesh before merging Yamuna
Yamuna -  Yamuna runs its most of the course parallel to Ganga before contributing its water to Ganga at Prayagraj. Largest of Ganga's southern tributaries
Gomti -  Starts near the junction of three borders viz. Nepal, Uttarakhand and UP
Ghaghra -  Starts in Nepal near Uttarakhand
 Son -  Not Himalayan river, covers MP, UP, Jharkhand and Bihar. Second Largest of Ganga's southern tributaries
Gandak -  Starts from Nepal
Kosi -  Starts from Nepal
Brahmaputra -  Merges with Ganga in Bangladesh. By now, flow velocity of both rivers slow down to considerable extent as they are in plains now.
Before entering Bangladesh, near Farakka in Malda District, Ganga leaves a distributary Hoogly,  which provides water for irrigation in West Bengal

Brahmaputra River System

The Brahmaputra river originates / starts from Tibet.

 Yarlung Tsangpo River -  originates and forms the upper stream of Brahmaputra in Tibet
 Siang -  main river after it enters India in the state of Arunachal Pradesh 
 Dibang - major tributary flowing through Arunachal Pradesh before merging into the Brahmaputra River in Assam
 Lohit - one of the three major tributaries of Brahmaputra flowing through Arunachal Pradesh from the easternmost India
 Brahmaputra -  runs across the state of Assam from East to West, entering Bangladesh afterwards
 Teesta -  one of the largest tributaries of Brahmaputra; originating in the borders of Sikkim and Tibet, flowing South it joins Brahmaputra in Bangladesh
 Jamuna River (Bangladesh) -  the Brahmaputra is known as Jamuna in Bangladesh

Indus River System
The Indus River originates in the northern slopes of the Kailash range near Lake Manasarovar in Tibet. Although most of the river's course runs through neighbouring Pakistan, as per as regulation of Indus water treaty of 1960, India can use only 20 percent of the water in this river. A portion of it does run through Indian territory, as do parts of the course. The rivers forming Panjnad are Chenab , Satluj , Jhelum , Ravi and Beas These tributaries are the source of the name of the Punjab of South Asia; the name is derived from the panch ("five") and aab ("water"), hence the combination of the words (Punjab) means "land with the water of five rivers".

The major rivers in Indus river system are (in order of their length):

Indus - 
Sutlej - 
Chenab - 
Jhelum - 
Ravi - 
Beas - 
Shyok - 
Zanskar - 
Galwan -  tributary of Shyok

Annual flows and other data
However, this rain is not uniform in time or geography. Most of the rains occur during its monsoon seasons (June to September), with the northeast and north receiving far more rains than India's west and south. Other than rains, the melting of snow year round over the Himalayas feeds the northern rivers to varying degrees. The southern rivers, however experience more flow variability over the year. For the Himalayan basin, this leads to flooding in some months and water scarcity in others. Despite extensive river system, safe clean drinking water as well as irrigation water supplies for sustainable agriculture are in shortage across India, in part because it has, as yet, harnessed a small fraction of its available and recoverable surface water resource. India harnessed  (20 percent) of its water resources in 2010, part of which came from unsustainable use of groundwater.

According to 2011 report of the Food and Agriculture Organization of the United Nations, India's basin wise distribution of catchment area and utilizable surface water resources is presented in the following table:

The peninsular river system
The main water divide in peninsular rivers is formed by the Western Ghats, which run from north to south close to the western coast. Most of the major rivers of the peninsula such as the Mahanadi, the Godavari, the Krishna and the Kaveri flow eastwards and drain into the Bay of Bengal. These rivers make delta at their mouths. The Narmada, Sharavati, Periyar and Tapti are the only long rivers, which flow west and make estuaries.

See also
Indian Rivers Inter-link
Amazon river basin
Nile river basin
Ganga
Indus
Nethravati

References

 Major rivers
 Major rivers